Ivan Ordets (born 8 July 1992) is a Ukrainian professional footballer who plays as a centre-back for Bundesliga club VfL Bochum on loan from Dynamo Moscow. He is a former Ukraine national team player.

Club career
Ordets started playing football at school age. He went on trial to Shakhtar Donetsk on 2 September 2002 and after two stages of selection he was enrolled in the group of Petro Ponomarenko. In the youth football league of Ukraine as a member of Shakhtar, he played 76 matches and scored 9 goals, but did not become champion of Ukraine: once he was a silver medalist (2007) and three times a bronze medalist (2006, 2008, 2009).

In the youth championship of Ukraine, he played 75 matches and scored 8 goals. In 2012, he became champion of Ukraine among reserves (in 2010, he was vice-champion).

In 2011, as part of a group of Donetsk talents, under the guidance of a youth coach, Valery Yaremchenko, he moved to Illichivets Mariupol. But the first attempt to gain a foothold in the main team of the Premier League club failed and Ordets returned to Shakhtar. But at the beginning of 2013, again going on loan, he noticeably improved the quality of the game and earned the trust of the new head coach Mykola Pavlov.

He made his debut in the Ukrainian Premier League on 2 March 2013 in the match against Metalurh Zaporizhia. He scored his first goal on 12 April 2013 against Volyn Lutsk. In the 2013–14 season, he played 27 matches in the Ukrainian Premier League without substitutions with a total of 2430 minutes played – more than anyone else on the team.

At the end of 2013, he was among the 33 best Ukrainian football players according to the Komanda newspaper.

In the summer of 2014 he returned to Shakhtar.

In the summer of 2019, he left Shakhtar and moved to Dynamo Moscow. At the start he was out of the starting eleven, only once having come on as a substitute in the match against Lokomotiv Moscow. In October, when a new head coach came, and the team began to play according to a different tactic, Ivan had much more minutes played on the field. He scored his first goal for Dynamo on 2 November 2019 against Akhmat Grozny, saving the team from defeat in the home field. He was voted "Player of the Month" for June/July 2020 by Dynamo fans. On 23 November 2021, he extended his contract until the end of the 2023–24 season with an option to extend for one more season.

On 10 July 2022, Ordets suspended his contract with Dynamo for the 2022–23 season using FIFA regulations related to the Russian invasion of Ukraine and joined VfL Bochum in Germany for the season.

International career
Ordets was a member of different Ukrainian national youth football teams. For the Ukraine U19 national team and scored one goal in a match against Sweden on 9 October 2010.

Career statistics

Club

International

Scores and results list Ukraine's goal tally first, score column indicates score after each Ordets goal.

Honours
Shakhtar Donestk
Ukrainian Premier League: 2016–17, 2017–18, 2018–19
Ukrainian Cup: 2015–16, 2016–17, 2017–18, 2018–19
Ukrainian Super Cup: 2014, 2015, 2017

References

External links

 
 
 

1992 births
Living people
Sportspeople from Donetsk Oblast
Ukrainian footballers
Association football defenders
Ukraine international footballers
Ukraine under-21 international footballers
Ukraine youth international footballers
Ukrainian Premier League players
Ukrainian Second League players
Russian Premier League players
Bundesliga players
FC Shakhtar Donetsk players
FC Mariupol players
FC Shakhtar-3 Donetsk players
FC Dynamo Moscow players
VfL Bochum players
Ukrainian expatriate footballers
Ukrainian expatriate sportspeople in Russia
Expatriate footballers in Russia
Ukrainian expatriate sportspeople in Germany
Expatriate footballers in Germany